Willie Fred "Bill" Webb (December 12, 1913 – June 1, 1994) was an American professional baseball pitcher. In one career game, he had a 0–0 record with a 9.00 ERA. He batted and threw right-handed.

Webb was born in Atlanta, Georgia, and died in Austell, Georgia.

References

External links

Venezuelan Professional Baseball League statistics

1913 births
1994 deaths
Baseball players from Atlanta
Carrollton Hornets players
Gadsden Pilots players
Lakeland Pilots players
Macon Peaches players
Major League Baseball pitchers
Minneapolis Millers (baseball) players
Mobile Shippers players
Montreal Royals players
New Orleans Pelicans (baseball) players
Patriotas de Venezuela players
Philadelphia Phillies players
Sportspeople from Cobb County, Georgia
St. Paul Saints (AA) players
People from Austell, Georgia